Adrian Wong Tsz-ching (born 1 May 1990) is a Hong Kong actress. She is best known as the daughter of Felix Wong, one of the Five Tiger Generals of TVB.

Background
Born on 1 May 1990 to actors Felix Wong and Leung Kit-wah in Hong Kong. Wong attended St. Rose of Lima's College and Hong Kong Polytechnic University. Leung died of organ failure at Gleneagles Hong Kong Hospital on May 26, 2020. In 2011 she started her hand-made product business under her own brand Oh My Deer.

In 2012, she joined HKTV to pursue her acting career, which she left in June 2015 as the contract expired. In 2015 she was discovered by executive producer Gary Tang, and starred as a lead actress for the first time in the Guangdong Radio and Television series As Long As Love is Forever Present with actor Oscar Chan. The TV series was released in Mainland China in December 2015.

Filmography

Film

Television series

Mircofilms

Variety shows

References

External links

1990 births
Living people
Hong Kong film actresses
Hong Kong television actresses
21st-century Hong Kong actresses